District is one of three districts of Yangzhou, Jiangsu province, China. It is one of the two districts (along with Hanjiang District) that divide Yangzhou's main urban area. It includes roughly the western half of Yangzhou's central city (excluding, however, the historic center, which is in Hanjiang District), and adjacent suburbs. The Yangtze River and, in the northern suburbs, the Grand Canal of China, serve as the district's southern and eastern borders.

In the past, the northern part of Yangzhou's main urban area constituted a separate Weiyang District, but in the late 2011 Weiyang District was abolished and merged into Hanjiang District.

Administrative divisions
Hanjiang District is divided to 10 subdistricts, 10 towns, and 3 townships:

10 Subdistricts

10 Towns

3 Townships
Pingshan
Shuangqiao
Chengbei

Gallery

References

www.xzqh.org

External links

County-level divisions of Jiangsu
Yangzhou